Kerodiadelia capicola is a species of beetle in the family Cerambycidae, and the only species in the genus Kerodiadelia. It was described by Sudre and Téocchi in 2002.

References

Desmiphorini
Beetles described in 2002
Monotypic beetle genera